The 1888 Penn State football team was an American football team that represented Pennsylvania State College—now known as Pennsylvania State University–as an independent during the 1888 college football season. The team played its home games on the Old Main lawn in University Park, Pennsylvania. The 1888 team is the only winless team in Penn State history. Harry Leyden (1887–1889) played quarterback in 1888.

Schedule

‡There is a score discrepancy. Lehigh lists the final score as 32–0.

References

Penn State
College football winless seasons
Penn State Nittany Lions football seasons
Penn State football